Venezuela Station is a station on Line H of the Buenos Aires Underground. The station was opened on 18 October 2007, as part of the inaugural section of the line, between Once - 30 de Diciembre and Caseros.

References

External links

Buenos Aires Underground stations
Balvanera
Railway stations opened in 2007
2007 establishments in Argentina